The Song of the Puszta is a 1920 German silent film directed by Carl Boese and starring Grete Hollmann and Ludwig Rex and Karl Falkenberg.

Cast
Charlotte Böcklin
Grete Hollmann
Ludwig Rex
Karl Falkenberg
Friedrich Kühne

References

External links

Films of the Weimar Republic
German silent feature films
Films directed by Carl Boese
German black-and-white films
1920s German films